Acaxees de Durango Fútbol Club is a Mexican professional football team based in Durango City, Mexico currently playing in Liga de Balompié Mexicano.

History 
In March 2020, a local businessman started the procedures for the entry of a local team in the Liga de Balompié Mexicano, a Mexican football competition independent of Femexfut. On July 13, the project was officially announced, that day it was reported that the club would be called Acaxees de Durango, the team was named in honor of a local tribe. On the 17th of the same month, the franchise's entry into the league was confirmed, becoming the fifteenth club in the competition. Francisco Calderón was appointed as the team manager.

On August 11, 2020, the Acaxees announced defender Patricio Araujo as their first official player. In September 2020 the club announced the construction of its own stadium.

On December 1, 2020, the club's franchise was put on hiatus by the LBM due to financial problems and the lack of a new board of directors that can provide financial support to the club. The team could return in the following season if it manages to improve its financial situation and complies with the guidelines of the competition.

Stadium 
The Estadio Francisco Zarco is a multi-use stadium in the Mexican city of Durango. The stadium holds 18,000 people. It is used mostly for football matches, and is the home stadium of Alacranes de Durango and the temporal stadium of Acaxees de Durango. The stadium is owned by the state of Durango. Acaxees announced the construction of its own stadium in the medium term.

Players

First-team squad

References 

Football clubs in Durango
Liga de Balompié Mexicano Teams
Association football clubs established in 2020
2020 establishments in Mexico
Durango City